Yi-Jia Susanne Hou (b. , Shanghai, China) is a Canadian violinist.

Born in Shanghai and raised in Mississauga, Hou grew up in a musical family.  At the age of nine, she studied at the Royal Conservatory of Music. She went on to attend The Juilliard School where she studied with Dorothy DeLay, Naoko Tanaka, and Cho-Liang Lin. At Juilliard, she completed BM and MM music degrees and received the Artist Diploma.

By age 17, the young violinist performed Paganini's Twenty-four Caprices for Solo Violin in Toronto and Aspen. She has also performed all ten of Beethoven's Piano and Violin Sonatas in New York as well as the complete collection of Brahms's Violin and Piano Sonatas and Piano Trios. Hou continues to perform as an international soloist and has recorded the Sibelius Violin Concerto and short works by Sarasate on her CD Fire & Ice with the Slovenia Radiotelevision Symphony Orchestra among other recordings.

She captured 3 gold medals with unanimous decisions at international violin competitions: Concours International Marguerite Long-Jacques Thibaud (France, 1999), the Rodolfo Lipizer International Violin Competition (Italy, 1999) and the Pablo Sarasate International Violin Competition (Spain, 1997).

She also won first place in the Canadian Music Competition for three consecutive years, the Juilliard Dvořák Concerto Competition, the Juilliard-Lehigh Valley Chamber Orchestra Competition, and the F. Nakamichi Sibelius Violin Competition at the Aspen Music Festival.

Hou has also been awarded the loan of the 1729 "ex-Heath" Guarneri del Gesu violin by the Canada Council for the Arts Instrument Bank Competition. She is the first ever violinist to earn First place twice and did it consecutively (2003 and 2006). In 2003 the instrument was valued at US$2.75 million. Her bow was made by her father, Alec Hou.

On Christmas Day, 2006, Susanne performed for the first time together with her father in China.  The emotional Shanghai orchestral performance, with Alec conducting and Susanne as the soloist, was the focus of a CBC The National documentary called "Return to Shanghai" by journalist Mychaylo Prystupa.  It aired in May 2007 on CBC television.

In 2009, Susanne Hou was granted the use of the 1735 "ex-Mary Portman, Fritz Kreisler Giuseppe Guarneri del Gesù, Cremona" by the Stradivari Society of Chicago.  The historic violin is famous as being once owned and bowed by Fritz Kreisler – widely regard as one of the most famous violinists in history.

Hou's music video 'The Devil's Delight', produced by Rhombus Media premiered on Bravo!TV in 2010; she also stars in a new documentary on the "Canada Council Instrument Bank", Produced by Rotating Planet and Directed by Ari Cohen for Bravo!  She performed the violin solo in the Atom Egoyan film "Adoration" which won the Ecumenical Jury Prize at Festival de Cannes, featuring music composed by Mychael Danna.

On Nov.27, 2013, Susanne Hou used the Kreisler violin to record Beethoven's 1806 Violin Concerto in D Major, Op. 61 with the London Symphony Orchestra. Hou chose the music as a "tribute" to Beethoven, Kreisler, and her parents Alec and Yvonne Hou.  The Beethoven concerto, with Kreisler's cadenzas, was the same music that her father Alec performed the night she was born.

The London recording was filmed for a documentary by Toronto's Know Rules Media in association with UK's HiBROW production company.  The film is expected to explore the rare violin's nearly 300-year history, including how it ended up in Hou's hands.

Sir Yehudi Menuhin referred to Hou as "absolutely phenomenal… one of the greatest young talents of the future…" and Jean-Jacques Kantorow, member of jury in the Concours International Marguerite Long-Jacques Thibaud said, "By the final round of the competition, Ms. Hou had the entire jury at her feet."

Awards

Winner, Canada Council for the Arts Instrument Bank Competition (Canada, 2003, 2006)
Gold Medal, Concours International Marguerite Long-Jacques Thibaud (France, 1999)
Gold Medal, Rodolfo Lipizer International Violin Competition (Italy, 1999)
Gold Medal, Pablo Sarasate International Violin Competition (Spain, 1997)
First Prize, Juilliard Dvořák Concerto Competition
First Prize, Juilliard-Lehigh Valley Chamber Orchestra Competition
First Prize, F. Nakamichi Sibelius Violin Competition at the Aspen Music Festival

Discography
you can never have too many suites (2008): de Falla Suite of Spanish Folk Songs, Shostakovich Four Preludes, Kreisler Liebesfreud, Schön Rosmarin & Syncopation, Yang Wong Luo Bin Suite of Folksongs & Dances, Tang New Face of my Motherland, and Li Ci Li Flower.
Fantasy (2007):  Schubert's Fantasia and Ave Maria, Gounod's Faust and Sarasate's Faust Fantasy
Chen Yi (2003): Momentum / Shui, Lin, Hou, Marshall, Singapore SO
Fire & Ice (2000): Sibelius Violin Concerto and shorter works by Sarasate

References

External links

1977 births
Living people
Canadian classical violinists
Canadian musicians of Chinese descent
Chinese emigrants to Canada
Juilliard School alumni
Long-Thibaud-Crespin Competition prize-winners
Musicians from Mississauga
Musicians from Shanghai
The Royal Conservatory of Music alumni
21st-century classical violinists
Women classical violinists